In anthropology, the matrilineal belt is an area in Africa south of the equator centered in south-central Africa where matrilineality is predominant. The matrilineal belt runs diagonally from the Atlantic to the Indian ocean, crossing Angola, Zambia, Malawi and Mozambique. The belt is linked to horticultural household economics, and Bantu groups that have embraced pastoralism have tended to lose matrilinearity.

Hypotheses linking the matrilineal belt to a supposed matrilineal Bantu expansion have been rejected as lacking evidence.

References

Belt regions
Cultural regions
Geography of Africa
Kinship and descent
Matriarchy